This is a list of historic places in Saguenay-Lac-Saint-Jean, Quebec, entered on the Canadian Register of Historic Places, whether they are federal, provincial, or municipal. All addresses are the administrative Region 02. For all other listings in the province of Quebec, see List of historic places in Quebec.

See also
List of historic places in Quebec

Saguenay
Saguenay–Lac-Saint-Jean